Soviet Storm: World War II in the East (Russian title: Советский Шторм: Вторая мировая война на Востоке; original Russian title — Великая война, English: The Great War) is a 2011 17-episode Russian television World War II series created by Anna Grazhdan, Artem Drabkin, and Aleksey Isaev. An online version includes 18 episodes, ordered chronologically.

The series consists of 2 seasons, which document and recount the most important, bloody, costly, and decisive events, battles, and personalities on the Eastern Front in World War II. Episodes generally last between 40 and 45 minutes and the overall series lasts approximately 12 hours.

Series 1

Series 2 

An online version adds an 18th episode, "The Battle of Kursk", and reorders the episodes more chronologically:

1.	Operation Barbarossa

2. 	The Battle of Kiev

3.	The Defence of Sevastopol

4. 	The Battle of Moscow

5.	The Siege of Leningrad

6.	Rzhev

7.	The Battle of Stalingrad

8.	The Battle for Caucasus

9.	The Battle of Kursk

10.	The Liberation of Ukraine

11.	Operation Bagration

12.	War in the Air

13.	War in the Sea

14.	The Partisan Movement

15.	Secret Intelligence of the Red Army

16.	The Battle for Germany

17.	Battle of Berlin

18. 	War Against Japan

See also 
 How Hitler Lost the War
 Hitler's Warriors
 World War II In HD Colour

References 

Soviet Union in World War II
Documentary television series about World War II